Kaeng Krachan Circuit is the second longest race track in Thailand, opened in 2010. It located in Phetchaburi Province. Elevation changes including uphill and downhill turns, increasing and decreasing radius curves, with high and low speed turns being included. The layout is in a valley, enabling spectators to see the entire circuit. Kaeng Krachan Circuit hosts several kinds of racing events: national level, club level, auto and motorcycle racing schools, track days and other activities such as product launches, movie and advertisement filming.

External links
 Kaeng Krachan Circuit, Official Website
 Kaeng Krachan Circuit, Tracks of the World Entry
 2012 Thai Racing Schedule, RacingWeb.NET

Motorsport venues in Thailand